China competed in the 1974 Asian Games which were held in Tehran, Iran from September 1, 1974 to September 16, 1974 for the first time. This time, the Asian Games Federation conference, which was held ten months before the Games, decided to expel the Republic of China from the games and accepted the entry of the People's Republic of China.

See also
 China at the Asian Games
 China at the Olympics
 Sport in China

References

Nations at the 1974 Asian Games
1974
Asian Games